Darya Vladimirovna Poverennova (born June 15, 1972), is a Russian theatre and film actress, and a granddaughter of the great Soviet actor Sergei Lukyanov.

Biography
Darya Poverennova was born on June 15, 1972. The actress' mother spent her career with the Taganka Theatre, and her grandmother, Nadezhda Tyshkevich, was a ballerina in Kiev. Her legendary grandfather, actor Sergei Lukyanov (who appeared in "Kuban Cossacks" and "The Captain's Daughter", died long before her birth. Darya's parents wanted her to follow in her father's footsteps and become a translator; she took intensive English courses and was tutored. However, she felt drawn to the theatre, where she applied, unsuccessfully, for further studies.  Despite this negative experience, she took a year to work as a director's assistant. Following this, she was accepted to the Boris Shchukin Theatre Institute and ultimately graduated.

At the end of her second year at the Institute, she married another student and gave birth to a daughter, Polina. Darya is now divorced.

Theatre
As of 1994, she has been affiliated with the Mayakovsky Theatre.

Filmography

References

External links

Official website 

1972 births
Living people
Actresses from Moscow
Russian film actresses
Russian television actresses
Russian stage actresses
20th-century Russian actresses
21st-century Russian actresses